Supertaça de Portugal de Futsal (English: Portuguese Futsal Super Cup) is a futsal cup in Portugal, played by the winners of Portuguese Futsal First Division and the winners of Portuguese Futsal Cup.

GDC Correio da Manhã were the first winners, in 1998, and the current holders are Sporting CP, with a record 11 trophies.

Winners

Performance by club

External links
 Futsalplanet site

Futsal
Futsal competitions in Portugal
Portugal